Paul Cosentino (born 2 November 1982) known mononymously by his stage name Cosentino, is an Australian illusionist and escapologist.

Early life 

Cosentino was born on 2 November 1982 in Victoria, Australia to an Italian family. When he was a young boy, Cosentino stumbled across a magic book in a library which fascinated him. His mother helped him read it, since as a child, he had learning difficulties that he says magic helped him overcome. As well as this, at age 13, his mother got locked out of the house one day, and to get inside Cosentino had to pick the locks. In lock picking he found a unique skill that he developed and honed. Cosentino also says that he gained confidence through his magic performances.  
As a boy growing up and to this day, Cosentino admires Harry Houdini saying, "As a child, some children had action figures of Superman....but Houdini, he was my superhero". He attended Wesley College, Melbourne, during his high school years.

Anchored Escape 
On 17 February 2010 Cosentino, in honor of Harry Houdini's jump off Queen's Bridge in Melbourne on the same day in 1910, performed a tribute underwater escape act inside the Melbourne Aquarium. Chained, shackled, handcuffed and secured to a 60 kg concrete block, Cosentino was sunk to the bottom of the main tank in Melbourne Aquarium – approximately four and a half meters deep – and surrounded by various fish, sharks and rays, he had to free himself from his bonds using only a lock pick. Cosentino had hoped to complete the escape in 2 minutes 30 seconds, but due to problems with a padlock and his belly chain, the escape took 3 minutes 39 seconds.

Television Appearances

Talkin’ 'Bout Your Generation

Cosentino made a brief appearance on popular Australian television show Talkin' 'Bout Your Generation, episode aired 22 March 2011, in the game ‘As Quick As’. He is introduced by Shaun first as "a lunatic from Ararat asylum" before the game begins. Contestants had to answer as many questions as possible before Cosentino escaped from a straitjacket.

Australia’s Got Talent

Cosentino auditioned in Melbourne for Australia's Got Talent. He auditioned with an illusion routine and was immediately put through by the judges, earning praise such as "I love the modern twist on it" and "That is like Michael Jackson makes magic."
In the preliminary finals, Cosentino stunned the judges and Australia with a daring escape act, in which he had to pick 9 locks while completely submerged in a tank of water suspended above the ground. The escape took 1 minute 45 seconds.

For the semi-final Cosentino performed an illusion routine, focused on the art of disappearing and reappearing, interspersed with lively military style dance.

The next round saw Cosentino returned to escapology. The escape involved Cosentino escaping from a straitjacket while suspended from his ankles, six meters above the ground, inside a jaws-like apparatus. These jaws were held open by a single piece of rope that was to be set alight for the act. Cosentino had to escape before the rope burned through and the jaws snapped around his ankle with over 200 kg of force.

On Grand Final night Cosentino took the audience back to the beginning, re-doing his initial audition with additional dance and an improved entrance.

Overall, Cosentino came second in the 2011 series of Australia's Got Talent, losing out to Jack Vidgen. Although fans were disappointed Cosentino was incredibly pleased with second place, so as to avoid the ‘winner’s curse.’

Carols in the Domain

Cosentino performed at Carols in the Domain in Sydney for magic tricks and arrival of Santa Claus.

Dancing with the Stars
Cosentino was announced as the winner of Dancing With The Stars on 26 November 2013, along with his dancing partner Jessica Raffa.

The Magic, The Mystery,  The Madness T.V Episodes
Cosentino has appeared in 3 T.V Episodes where he performed Illusions, Escapes and Street Magic on the Streets of Melbourne and Sydney.

Asia's Got Talent
Cosentino appeared at the Asia's Got Talent result show where he performed a disappearing act.

America's Got Talent: The Champions
Cosentino competed in America's Got Talent: The Champions in 2019. He did not advance to the finals.

I'm A Celebrity...Get Me Out of Here!
Cosentino appeared as an intruder in the sixth season of I'm a Celebrity...Get Me Out of Here! Australia in 2020.

Tours 
 Global Tour 2006
 Threshold Tour 2008
 Hong Kong Christmas Tour 2009
 Hale & Pace National Tour 2009
 Distortions Tour 2011
 Distortions (Back by popular demand) Tour 2012
 The Magic, The Mystery, The Madness Tour 2013
 The Twisted Reality Tour 2015 in Indonesia (Makassar)
 The Twisted Reality Tour 2015 in Australia
 The Twisted Reality Reloaded Tour 2016 in Melbourne Australia
 Anything is Possible 2019 Tour in Australia

Anything is Possible Book 
In October 2016 Cosentino published his first book titled Anything is Possible: The Magic, The Mystery, The Life (2016). In the book he talks about his mind patterns and inspirations and how they helped him in his illusion career.

References

External links

 
 
 

1982 births
Australian people of Italian descent
Australian magicians
Dancing with the Stars (Australian TV series) winners
I'm a Celebrity...Get Me Out of Here! (Australian TV series) participants
People from Melbourne
Living people
Escapologists
Australia's Got Talent contestants